William Bradbury (11 March 1889 – 1963) was an English footballer who played as a wing half in the Football League for Oldham Athletic and Rochdale.

References

1889 births
1963 deaths
Sportspeople from Burton upon Trent
English footballers
Aberdare Town F.C. players
Oldham Athletic A.F.C. players
Scunthorpe United F.C. players
Rochdale A.F.C. players
Burton Town F.C. players
English Football League players
Association footballers not categorized by position